Barna Bor (born 12 December 1986) is a retired Hungarian judoka.  He competed at the 2008 and 2012 Summer Olympics.  At the 2008 Summer Olympics, he lost in the last 32 to Islam El Shehaby.  At the 2012 Summer Olympics, he beat Luuk Verbij in the first round, then El Mehdi Malki in the second round, before losing to Andreas Tölzer in the quarterfinal.  In the repechage, he lost to Rafael Silva in the first round.

Achievements

References

External links
 
 
 

1986 births
Living people
Hungarian male judoka
Judoka at the 2008 Summer Olympics
Judoka at the 2012 Summer Olympics
Judoka at the 2016 Summer Olympics
Olympic judoka of Hungary
People from Pest, Hungary
Universiade medalists in judo
Universiade bronze medalists for Hungary
Judoka at the 2015 European Games
European Games competitors for Hungary
Medalists at the 2009 Summer Universiade
Medalists at the 2013 Summer Universiade
21st-century Hungarian people